The Tribute of the Three Cows is a yearly ceremony that gathers together the people of the neighbouring Pyrenean valleys of the  (in Béarn, France) and the Roncal Valley (in Navarre, Spain). The ceremony takes place every 13 July on the summit of the Col de la Pierre St Martin, by a stone called St Martin's stone which traditionally demarcates the border between Roncal and Barétous. There, the people of Barétous hand over three cows to the people of Roncal, as a peace tribute that has been paid every year since at least 1375.

The Tribute of the Three Cows is sometimes regarded as the oldest international treaty still enforced. Its exact origin is unknown, but documental evidence shows that it long predates the 1375 legal arbitration that established its current format. In fact, the war treaty after the invasion of Cimbri and Barétounais in 125 is thought to have been the start of this tribute.

Albeit traditionally referred to as a tribute, the payment of the three cows is a synallagmatic contract between equals (i.e., without any of its parts being suzerain to the other). It was established through the mediation of a third party, the people of Ansó, which then belonged to a different realm. The arbitration decision was issued in Ansó (Aragón, nowadays Spain) on 16 October 1375, and official records of its celebration date back to at least 1575; records certifying its celebration prior to 1575 have not survived. The ceremony has since taken place on a yearly basis, and has only been suspended twice: in 1793 during the War of the Convention between France and Spain, and in 1940 during the Nazi occupation of France; in both cases, the Barétous were prevented by regional authorities from attending the ceremony out of fear they would escape to Spain.

Nowadays, the ceremony has great touristic interest, and draws a large number of visitors. It is regarded as intangible cultural heritage by the government of Navarre.

Ceremony 

The ceremony involves a group of representatives from Barétous and Roncal, typically the mayors of the towns and villages of Isaba, Uztárroz, Urzainqui, and Garde for the valley of Roncal, and the mayors of Ance, Aramits, Arette, Féas, Issor, and Lanne-en-Barétous representing the valley of Barétous.

At about 10 o'clock in the morning of 13 July, the representatives of Roncal — styling their traditional garment consisting of a short black cloak, doublet, breeches, broad linen collar, and a hat — gather on the Spanish side of boundary marker no.262, which substitutes for the traditional pierre de St Martin (lost since 1858). The representatives of Barétous, dressed in Sunday clothes and holding the tricolor French flag, approach the boundary marker from the French side. Traditionally, the mayor of Isaba would hold a pike against the Barétous representatives, and these would also be held at gunpoint by the rest of representatives of Roncal; this custom was dropped in the late 19th century.

The mayor of Isaba, presiding over the ceremony, asks the Barétous representatives three times, in Spanish, whether they are willing, as in previous years, to pay the tribute of the Three Cows of two years of age, of the same coat and with the same sort of horns, and without blemish or injury. Each time the Barétous representatives answer in Spanish, "Sí, señor" [Yes, sir].

Following this, one of the representatives of Barétous places his or her right hand on the boundary marker; a representative from Roncal follows by placing his or hers on top of it, and so on, until all representatives have placed their right hands on the boundary marker. The last one to place his hand is the mayor of Isaba, who then utters the following words:

All those witnessing the ceremony repeat the same words.

The representatives of Roncal are then presented with the three cows, which are then examined by the veterinarian of Isaba, who must certify they are healthy. Afterwards, the cows are divided amongst the towns and villages of the valley of Roncal: two cows are given to the town of Isaba, whilst the other one is given in alternating fashion to the villages of Uztarroz, Urzainqui, and Garde. 

He then asks all those having any objection to step forward and make it.

Once the ceremony is over, the minutes of the ceremony are readied by the secretary, and they are certified and signed by the representatives of Roncal and Barétous. Guests of honour usually sign the minutes as witnesses. Afterwards, all those gathered celebrate a communal meal where they eat stewed lamb.

Owing to the 1990s mad cow disease scandal, Spain and France banned mutual exports of non-quarantined cattle, so nowadays the cows involved in the tribute are returned to Barétous after the ceremony, and the tribute is paid for in money instead, amounting to the value of three cows.

History 
The valley of Roncal is the easternmost valley of the Navarrese Pyrenees, whilst the valley of Barétous is the first Pyrenean valley of Béarn. Historically, Roncal belonged to the kingdom of Navarre, that held territory both in the southern side of the Pyrenees (centred around Pamplona) and on the northern mountain side, including the provinces of Lower Navarre and Soule in modern France. The Béarn polity, albeit nominally under the sovereignty of the Duchy of Gascony (for a long time in the High Middle Ages under the control of the Kingdom of England), had acquired a de facto independent status, and was governed by the Viscounts of Béarn.

The Tribute of the Three Cows arises from boundary disputes over the high pastures of Navarre and Béarn. The origin of these disputes is unknown, but evidence of them can be found in documents dating back to the 13th century.

In the 14th century, the count of Foix, Gaston Fébus, acquired control over Béarn, and in 1374 he refused to acknowledge the sovereignty of France or England over it. In the following decades, the kings of France and England tried successively and in vain to assert their sovereignty over Béarn, whilst the counts of Foix remained largely independent. At the same time, on the death of Joan I of Navarre in 1305, the kingdom of Navarre passed to her son Louis X of France, whereby the crowns of Navarre and France fell under a personal union of the French monarchy, the main threat to the counts of Foix and viscounts of Béarn. Thus, it was at a time when the relationship between Navarre and Béarn were deteriorating that the border dispute between Roncal and Barétous arose.

During the 14th century, the disputes over grazing grounds became increasingly alarming. Albeit some form of compact was in place, whereby in order to hold the peace cows were paid by Baretous to Roncal, the fights and brawls amongst shepherds of either valley became increasingly violent. The most notorious of these fights was the so-called battle of Beotivar of 1321, in which the governor of Navarre and two merinos intervened, resulting in the death of one of the merinos and twelve other people. In a similar incident in 1335, 35 people died.

These altercations led to the drafting of a memorial in 1350, during the reign of Charles IV of France (who had inherited the crown of Navarre as well), that enumerated border disputes throughout the kingdom of Navarre. The document explains that the quarrels arise mainly over the use of water sources in the mountain passes between Roncal and Barétous. A mention is made in it that both the Viscount of Béarn and the King had tried to settle the disputes peacefully:

In a second document dating 1361, the lieutenant of the merino (military governor) of Sangüesa mentions the dispute and that the king of Navarre ought to assert his rightful claim over certain mountain passes that the people of Baretous were trying to take over:

In this case, Charles IV ordered the lieutenant to move troops to Isaba to ensure peace and that the mountain passes that were rightfully Navarrese remained so:

Throughout these years, several failed attempts at reconciliation were made, mediated by the Aragonese town of Ansó, and the bishops of Bayonne, of Oloron, of Pamplona, and of Jaca.

Events of 1373 

The conflict escalated further until 1373, when the legendary events leading to the arbitration of Ansó of 1375 took place.

The accounts say in 1373 two shepherds, Pedro Karrika from Isaba and Pierre Sansoler from Arette, met with their flocks on the mountain Arlas, on what officially was territory of the kingdom of Navarre. After an argument, they quarreled, and Karrika killed Sansoler. The cousin of Sansoler, Anginar Sansoler, gathered together a band of people from Barétous, and tried to track down Karrika. When they failed to find Karrika on the highlands, they descended towards Belagua in Roncal, where they found Karrika's wife, Antonia Garde, then pregnant. After asking her about the whereabouts of her husband, the band killed her. News of her death reached the town of Isaba, where Karrika and others formed an opposing group that set out to avenge her death. They arrived in Sansoler's house whilst the latter was celebrating the murder. The people of Isaba slaughtered everyone present except for Sansoler's wife and baby son, who were spared. Upon hearing of this killing, the people of Arette retaliated by ambushing Karrika and his band, who were then killed in a fight were a total of 25 people died. Legend has it that the people of Barétous were led by a terrifying cagot with four ears; though the fight was being won by those from Barétous, Lucas Lopéz de Garde managed to slay the cagot captain, and the rest of the group from Barétous fled the fight demoralised. News of the events reached the king of Navarre and the viscount of Béarn, who tried in vain to settle the dispute.

The dispute grew in strength until the so-called battle of Aguincea, were 53 Roncalese and 200 Baretouses died. In the end, the Barétous asked for a truce, and the Roncalese agreed for the dispute to be settled by arbitration in Ansó, a nearby town in the then independent kingdom of Aragon.

The arbitration of Ansó 
The town of Ansó examined the causes of the dispute, and on 16 October 1375 issued an arbitration that is still standing. In the preamble, the arbitration states that the mayor of Ansó, Sancho García, and five more residents of Ansó have heard the arguments of the representatives of Roncal and Barétous with the respective permission of the king of Navarre, Charles IV, and the viscount Béarn, Gaston Fébus. The residents of the valley of Soule are also mentioned as arbiters in the dispute.

The arbitration details the work carried by the mayor of Ansó and the rest of arbiters to settle the dispute. They examined witnesses and relevant documents, and travelled to the disputed border, where they settled the border between Roncal and Bératous on the so-called rock of Saint Martin, between Isaba and Aramits. Water sources were listed, and a detailed division of the usage of the latter by the flocks from Arette was established. It establishes that the high pastures and water sources lie in Navarrese territory, but the Bératous were granted right of gracing from 10 July to 8 September, and the people of Roncal thereafter until Christmas.

Harsh fines were established for any transgression, involving seizure of lands and cattle, and a 300  fine for anyone that called to arms. The arbitration then establishes that perhaps in compensation for the deaths and harm caused by Beratous on Roncal, or perhaps for the usage of the water sources, each year Barétous must pay three cows to the people of Isaba, Uztarroz, Garde, and Urzainqui. Thus the tribute of the three cows was established. Scholars tend to agree that although seemingly starting as compensation over the conflict, the tribute quickly evolved into a payment in kind for the Barétous to be allowed the use of grazing grounds and water sources in Roncalese territory; it also contributed to strengthen the bonds between the two valleys, and to keeping the peace amongst shepherds and cattle ranchers on either side of the Pyrenees. Although in origin it might have been an onerous tribute, by the 16th century the payment of three cows in exchange for access to the water sources in Larra and Aranz was regarded as highly advantageous to the people of Barétous.

The arbitration has thereafter been ratified numerous times, including in the Peace of the Pyrenees and in the Treaty of Bayonne of 1856 between Spain and France, which settled the current border between France and Spain.

Subsequent history 
The  (peace treaty) of 1375 succeeded in pacifying the relationships between both valleys, even if in 1389 amendments had to be added to specify issues related to the breeding of cattle. Thereafter the relationship between Roncal and Barétous became essentially friendly.

On 27 September 1427, a fire destroyed the town of Isaba, including the church that hosted the original treaty, and records of the ceremonies that had taken place thereto. Copies were issued in 1433 to substitute for the destroyed originals.

The first extant record of the ceremony of 13 July dates to 1477:

The monarchs of Navarre and the viscounts of Béarn enforced and ratified the arbitration, and in 1483, with the marriage of Catherine of Foix to John III of Navarre, the sovereignty of both territories fell under personal union of the Navarrese monarchy until 1512, which strengthened the links between both valleys. That year, Ferdinand II of Aragon invaded Navarre, and after an extended war, the valley of Roncal fell under Aragonese sovereignty, whilst Béarn remained under control of the remnants of Navarre. Despite this, Ferdinand II chose to ratify the arbitration.

In 1571, chronicler Esteban de Garibay recorded the first complete description of the ceremony, which remains largely unchanged. The first recorded interruption of the tribute dates back to 1698, when the Barétous valley paid a fine of 300 silver marks instead. In 1755, one of the cows was rejected by Roncal, having been found blemished, small, ill-coated and with other defects. The cow was substituted within a fortnight, and carried by the Barétous to Isaba.

The first major interruption of the Tribute ceremony took place during the War of the Convention that started in 1793 between France and Spain. Due to the presence of troops in the Pyrenean mountain passes, the representatives of Aramits were prevented from climbing to the Col of la Pierre St Martin, so they instead took the cows all the way to Isaba the following month, leaving the cows in Isaba's main square on 17 August 1793.

During the Peninsular War, the dates of the ceremony were moved. In 1810, the ceremony took place on 16 July, and from 1811 to 1814 it was paid in money instead.

The Treaty of Bayonne of 1856 established the modern border between France and Spain, and was aimed at solving the proverbial problems surrounding the grazing grounds in the Pyrenees. As a result of this treaty, the pierre de St Martin (the traditional boundary marker around which the ceremony had taken place since 1375) was removed and substituted by a simple boundary marker, around which the ceremony takes place ever since.

The tribute started to become notorious at the end of the 19th century, when it was popularised in France in numerous books and news articles, usually in negative light as a humiliation towards the people of France. The negative press prompted an attempt in 1895 to substitute the cows for money, without success. That year, Le Figaro published an open letter protesting against a ceremony they deemed extravagant and anti-French. The ceremony was described as a war tribute, where the Barétous had to uncover their heads whilst the Roncalese could wear their hats, and where the Barétous had to advance towards the Roncalese whilst the latter pointed at them with pike. As a result, over 600 people climbed the Col de la Pierre St Martin that year to demonstrate against the ceremony.

The second major interruption of the ceremony took place in 1944, when the Nazis prevented the French from partaking of the ceremony out of fear they would attempt to escape to Spain instead. As compensation, the Barétous provided an additional cow for the following two years, the last one being forgiven by the Rocalese.

Due to difficult access and rough terrain around the Col de la Pierre St Martin, until the mid 20th century the representatives of Roncal and Barétous had to depart the day before the ceremony and then spend a night mid-way. In the 1960s, a road was built from Spain to the summit, and it was soon connected to the French valleys when the Arette-Pierre-Saint-Martin ski resort was developed on the French side, near the summit. Thereafter, the ceremony has become a prime touristic event, drawing increasing numbers of people every year.

Gallery

References

Bibliography

Further reading 
 

Treaties of France
Treaties of Spain
Treaties of the County of Foix
1370s treaties
1375 in Europe
1375 establishments in Europe
History of Navarre